Ippolito Nievo (30 November 1831 – 4 March 1861) was an Italian writer, journalist and patriot. His Confessions of an Italian is widely considered the most important novel about the Italian Risorgimento.

Life
Nievo was born and raised in Padua, during the time the Veneto region was ruled by the Austrian Empire. His father was a lawyer. Nievo studied law at the University of Padua, but upon graduating, he refused to join his father's profession as it would imply submission to the Austrian government. He was politically inspired by Giuseppe Mazzini's thought and wanted to join the struggle for the independence of Veneto and a united Italy. In 1860 he fought with Giuseppe Garibaldi's Expedition of the Thousand, who, after having defeated the Bourbon army in Sicily and Southern Italy, gave those regions to the King of Sardinia Victor Emmanuel II. On 18 February 1861, in fulfilment of Nievo's hopes, Italy was unified under the House of Savoy. Shortly afterwards, in March, Nievo died in a shipwreck in the Tyrrhenian Sea.

Ippolito Nievo appears in the Umberto Eco novel The Prague Cemetery. In this novel, Nievo's ship was secretly blown up by the fictional protagonist Simonini in order to destroy the financial documents.

Confessions of an Italian
Nievo is best known for his novel Confessions of an Italian, an abridged English translation appeared under the title The Castle of Fratta in 1957, with a full translation by Frederika Randall that included an introduction by Lucy Riall being published by Penguin Books London in 2014. Written between December 1857 and August 1858, the work is in twenty-three chapters. Nievo died before it could receive its final editing. Nievo himself did not find a publisher, and it was only in 1867, six years after the writer's death, that the novel was published under the title Confessioni di un ottuagenario (Confessions of an octogenarian). The author's original title, by which the book is now generally known, was Le Confessioni d'un italiano, but this seemed to be too "political" for the times.

The novel is both historical (its background is events in Italy in the last decades of the 18th century and the first half of the 19th century) and psychological, being based upon the memories of "Carlo Altoviti", the main character and first-person narrator. It is widely considered the most important novel about the Italian Risorgimento.

Influences 
There are similarities between W. M. Thackeray's earlier novel The History of Henry Esmond and Confessions of an Italian, both in the fundamental structure of the plot, in the psychological outlines of the main characters, in frequent episodes and in the use of metaphors.

Other works
Nievo wrote also poetry (Versi, 1854–55), short stories, mainly set in the countryside of Friuli, the region where Nievo lived as a young boy, and novels (Il conte pecoraio, Angelo di bontà, Il barone di Nicastro, Il Varmo).

His political engagement was reflected in two essays: Venezia e la libertà d'Italia (1860) and Frammento sulla rivoluzione nazionale (published 1929).

References

Further reading 
 Chamber's Encyclopedia Volume 10 page 35
 Giulio Ferroni, Profilo storico della letteratura italiana, Einaudi scuola, Milan, 1992

External links
Website about Ippolito Nievo 
Website about Confessions of an Italian

Deaths due to shipwreck

1831 births
1861 deaths
Writers from Padua
Italian journalists
Italian male journalists
19th-century journalists
19th-century Italian male writers
Members of the Expedition of the Thousand